The 2003–04 Football League First Division (referred to as the Nationwide First Division for sponsorship reasons) was the twelfth and final season of the league under the First Division name, and the twelfth season under its current league division format.

Changes from last season

From First Division
Promoted to Premier League
Portsmouth
Leicester City
Wolverhampton Wanderers

Relegated to Second Division
Brighton & Hove Albion
Grimsby Town
Sheffield Wednesday

To First Division
Promoted from Second Division
Wigan Athletic
Crewe Alexandra
Cardiff City

Relegated from Premier League
Sunderland
West Bromwich Albion
West Ham United

Team overview

Stadia and locations

League table

Play-offs

Semi-finals

First leg

Second leg

Aggregate score 4-4. Crystal Palace win 5-4 on penalties.

West Ham United win 2-1 on aggregate.

Final

External links
Full Results

 
Football League First Division seasons

England
3